In enzymology, a nuatigenin 3beta-glucosyltransferase is an enzyme that catalyzes the chemical reaction

UDP-glucose + (20S,22S,25S)-22,25-epoxyfurost-5-ene-3beta,26-diol  UDP + (20S,22S,25S)-22,25-epoxyfurost-5-ene-3beta,26-diol 3-O-beta-D-glucoside

Thus, the two substrates of this enzyme are UDP-glucose and (20S,22S,25S)-22,25-epoxyfurost-5-ene-3beta,26-diol, whereas its 3 products are UDP, (20S,22S,25S)-22,25-epoxyfurost-5-ene-3beta,26-diol, and 3-O-beta-D-glucoside.

This enzyme belongs to the family of glycosyltransferases, specifically the hexosyltransferases.  The systematic name of this enzyme class is UDP-glucose:(20S,22S,25S)-22,25-epoxyfurost-5-ene-3beta,26-diol 3-O-beta-D-glucosyltransferase. This enzyme is also called uridine diphosphoglucose-nuatigenin glucosyltransferase.

References

 
 

EC 2.4.1
Enzymes of unknown structure